"Help Is On the Way" is a song by American rock band Rise Against, featured on their sixth studio album Endgame (2011). Inspired by lead vocalist Tim McIlrath's visit to New Orleans, the song is about the slow response time for aid to disaster stricken areas. It incorporates elements of punk rock and melodic hardcore, with lyrics that allude to Hurricane Katrina and the Deepwater Horizon oil spill. "Help Is On the Way" premiered on KROQ-FM on January 17, 2011, and was later released as Endgames lead single on January 25.

"Help Is On the Way" polarized critics, with some praising its lyrics and song structure, while others criticized it for being bland and repetitive. Despite the mixed reception, it remains one of the band's highest-charting singles to date. It peaked at eighty-nine on the Billboard Hot 100, and reached number two on the  Hot Rock Songs chart. The accompanying music video depicts a family, as they attempt to escape increasing floodwater levels that engulf their neighborhood.

Composition

"Help Is on the Way" is a rock song containing elements of punk rock and melodic hardcore. John Fortunato of The Aquarian Weekly described the song as a "menacingly anthemic, phlegm-clearing diatribe". "Help Is on the Way" is written in the time signature of common time, with a moderate tempo of 108 beats per minute. It is composed in the key G minor, with a melody that spans a tonal range of D4 to B♭5.

Lyrically, "Help Is on the Way" is about the slow response time for aid to disaster stricken areas. During the first and second verses, the lyrics allude to Hurricane Katrina and the Deepwater Horizon oil spill, as well as their affects on the Gulf Coast of the United States and the city of New Orleans. Singer Tim McIlrath maintains clean vocals throughout the majority of the song, but temporarily switches to screaming vocals during the bridge.

McIlrath wrote the lyrics, which were inspired by a trip he took to New Orleans. While he had initially gone to discuss with local musicians how to merge politics with music, he was able to visit several areas affected by Hurricane Katrina and the subsequent flood, such as the Lower Ninth Ward. As McIlrath felt that news outlets were quick to discuss less important stories following the disaster, he compiled his thoughts and wrote the song's lyrics. McIlrath also noted his criticism of the United States government and how they handled these disasters influenced the lyrics; he called Hurricane Katrina "as much a man-made disaster as it was a natural disaster", and lambasted the fact that no legislation was passed to prevent another oil spill following the Deepwater Horizon oil spill.

Release and reception
"Help Is on the Way" had its world premiere on the California radio-station KROQ-FM on January 17, 2011. It was then released on January 25, as the lead single from Rise Against's sixth album Endgame. Commercially, "Help Is on the Way" is one of Rise Against's most successful singles to date. In the United States, it remains the band's only song to reach the Billboard Hot 100, where it peaked at eighty-nine, and reached number two on the Hot Rock Songs chart. The single also achieved international success, reaching number ten on the Australia Hitseekers chart, number forty-five on the Canadian Hot 100, number four on the Czech Republic Modern Rock chart, and number nineteen on the UK Rock & Metal chart.

Critics were polarized in their opinions when reviewing "Help Is on the Way". Tim Newbound of Rock Sound described the piece as "impressively structured and equally furious", while Evan Lucy of Billboard thought it was "understated enough to capture radio attention and plenty explosive to please Rise Against's devoted fan base". Rob Parker of NME felt that "Help Is on the Way" and fellow Endgame track "This Is Letting Go" were able to "strike the perfect balance between punk fury and melodic accessibility without losing any of frontman Tim McIlrath’s personality". Chad Grischow of IGN complimented the music, saying that "as powerful as the lyrical content of the song is, the storm of guitars rolling over it like a gristly, foreboding cloud kick you in the chest just as hard".

Koski and Steven Hyden of The A.V. Club were divided in their opinions, with Koski praising the powerful lyrics, while Hyden belittled the song as "run-of-the-mill". Thomas Nassiff of AbsolutePunk wrote that "Help Is on the Way" was one of the weaker moments from the album, criticizing the intro guitar riff, while comparing the lyrics to those of another Rise Against song, "Re-Education (Through Labor)". Johnny Firecloud of CraveOnline was heavily critical of the song, stating that it "suffers from a blandness so paralyzing and repetitive", and ultimately summarized it as "totally flaccid".

Music video

The accompanying music video was directed by Alan Ferguson and filmed in New Orleans. It follows a family as they're forced to move into their house's attic, and eventually their rooftop to escape the increasing floodwater levels caused by Hurricane Katrina. The video follows the song's lyric thread, while real footage of Hurricane Katrina and the survivors are shown throughout. It ends with a message encouraging donations, and a link to the band's activism website.

The video was released on March 23, 2011. It does not feature any band members, who opted not to appear in it, as they felt their presence would be detrimental to the video's message. This decision was commended by critics, with Katie Hasty of HitFix stating that band "went for an artifact of truth".

Credits and personnel
Credits adapted from the liner notes of Endgame.

Rise Against
 Tim McIlrath – lead vocals, rhythm guitar 
 Zach Blair – lead guitar, backing vocals
 Joe Principe – bass guitar, backing vocals
 Brandon Barnes – drums

Additional backing vocals by Chad Price

Production
 Bill Stevenson, Jason Livermore – producers
 Bill Stevenson, Jason Livermore, Andrew Berlin – audio engineering
 Chris Lord-Alge – mixing
 Ted Jensen – mastering

Charts

Weekly Charts

Year-end charts

References

Notes

Footnotes

External links

2011 singles
2011 songs
DGC Records singles
Interscope Records singles
Music videos directed by Alan Ferguson (director)
Rise Against songs
Songs about New Orleans
Songs written by Tim McIlrath
Political songs